The Convair XB-53 was a proposed jet-powered medium bomber aircraft, designed by Convair for the United States Army Air Forces. With a radical tailless, forward-swept wing design, the aircraft appeared futuristic; however, the project was canceled before either of the two prototypes were completed.

Design and development
The project was originally designated XA-44 in 1945 under the old "attack" category. An unusual forward-swept wing-design powered by three J35-GE turbojets, the project was developed in parallel with Convair's XB-46. The original design had a wing with a 12° forward-sweep and a solid nose section, but when the Army Air Force revamped the advanced attack aircraft requirement into a light bomber requirement in 1946, the aircraft was redesignated XB-53 and the wing redesigned with a 30° forward-sweep and 8° dihedral that was borrowed from German wartime research, but also a glazed nose section. The swept-forward configuration would give the aircraft a greater climb rate and maneuverability. It looked promising enough at one point for the Army Air Force to consider canceling the XB-46 in favor of the XA-44, since there was not enough funding for both.

Classified as a medium bomber, the XB-53 would have carried up to 12,000 pounds of bombs as well as 40 High Velocity Aerial Rockets (HVAR) mounted on underwing pylons.

Convair argued for completion of the XB-46 prototype as a flying testbed, without armament and other equipment, and with the substitution of two XA-44s for the other two B-46 airframes on contract. The Air Force ratified this in June 1946 but the project did not progress, nor were additional B-46s built. The XB-53 program was reinstated in February 1949 but only for a short while.

Specifications (XB-53 estimated)

See also

References

Notes

Bibliography

 Andrade, John M. U.S. Military Aircraft Designations and Serials since 1909. Earl Shilton, Leicester: Midland Counties Publications, 1979. .
 Jones, Lloyd S. U.S. Bombers, B-1 1928 to B-1 1980s. Fallbrook, California: Aero Publishers, 1962, second edition 1974. .
 Knaack, Marcelle Size. Encyclopedia of U.S. Air Force Aircraft and Missile Systems, Volume II – Post-World War II Bombers 1945–1973. Washington, D.C.: Office of Air Force History, USAF, 1988. .
 Wagner, Ray. American Combat Planes – Second Edition.  Garden City, New York: Doubleday and Company, 1968. .

External links

 Convair XB-53, from USAF Museum
 Convair XB-53 – Aviation Enthusiast Corner
 Fantastic Plastic model of the Convair XB-53

B-53
Forward-swept-wing aircraft
Tailless aircraft
Trijets
Cancelled military aircraft projects of the United States